Jayakody Arachchige Asela Madushan (born 9 December 1999), commonly known as Asela Madushan, is a Sri Lankan footballer who currently plays as a forward for Renown.

Career statistics

International

International goals
Scores and results list Sri Lanka's goal tally first.

References

1999 births
Living people
Sri Lankan footballers
Sri Lanka international footballers
Association football forwards
Renown SC players
Sri Lanka Football Premier League players